El Arnab is a traditional Arab solitaire based on the general equipment and gameplay of mancala games. It is played by the Kababish people of Sudan. The name "El Arnab" means "the rabbit".

Rules
El Arnab's board is a mancala board comprising 2 rows of 3 pits each, with an additional larger pits ("stores") located at each end of the board. The game setup is as follows:

 3 seeds in the lefthand store;
 1 seed in the righthand store;
 2 seeds in each of the four pits at the extremes of the rows;
 1 seed in each of the remaining pits.

3 | 2 1 2 |  
  | - - - |  
  | 2 1 2 | 1

To begin the game, the player takes all the seeds from the pit at the upper left corner of the rows, and relay-sows them counterclockwise. Sowing also includes the stores.

This relay sowing (and thus the game itself) never ends; it is meant to be just a pastime. It happens that every 27 circuits of the board, the board goes back to its initial setup.

In his 1925 article R. Davies stated that the pattern repeats every 26 circuits; but he miscounted. His informant, an elderly Arab, seems to have been aware of this; when Davies said he counted 26 the informant made a joke that apparently went over Davies' head.

References
R. Davies, Some Arab Games and Puzzles. In «Sudan Notes & Records» 8 (1925), pp. 137–152.

Traditional mancala games
Sudanese culture